Sigrún Pálsdóttir (born 1967) is an Icelandic writer and historian. She was born in Reykjavík in 1967. She obtained her doctorate from Oxford University in 2001, and then taught and researched at the University of Iceland. A prominent Icelandic historian, she served as the editor of Saga, the premier scholarly journal of the discipline, from 2009 to 2016. She has written a number of acclaimed historical narratives, among them Þóra biskups (Thora: A Bishop’s Daughter, 2010) and Ferðasaga (Uncertain Seas, 2010).

Her debut novel Kompa (That Little Dark Room, 2006) was followed by Delluferðin (2019); the latter won the EU Prize for Literature. Her books have been nominated for numerous prizes, such as the Icelandic Literary Prize, the Women’s Literature Prize, the DV Cultural Prize for Literature, Hagthenkir Prize, Icelandic Booksellers Prize, etc. Kompa was released in English translation by the University of Rochester press under the title History. A Mess.

References

 

1967 births
Living people
Sigrun Palsdottir
Sigrun Palsdottir